Cecília ("Ciça") Canetti (born January 16, 1987 in Rio de Janeiro) is a female water polo player from Brazil, who finished in fourth place with the Brazil women's national water polo team at the 2007 Pan American Games. She also competed at the 2007 World Aquatics Championships, finishing in tenth place.

References
  Profile

1987 births
Living people
Brazilian female water polo players
Water polo players from Rio de Janeiro (city)
21st-century Brazilian women
Water polo players at the 2007 Pan American Games